Launitz is a surname. Notable people with the surname include:

Eduard Schmidt von der Launitz (1796–1869), Russian-German sculptor
Robert Eberhard Launitz (1806–1870), Russian-American sculptor, nephew of Eduard
Wilhelm Schmidt von der Launitz (1802–1864), Baltic German general

See also
Lauritz